Cumpăna is a commune in Constanța County, Romania

Cumpăna may also refer to:

Cumpăna (Argeș), a tributary of the river Argeș in Argeș County
Cumpăna (Topolog), a tributary of the river Topolog in Argeș County